Selenogyrus is a genus of spider, or more specifically, selenogyrine theraphosid. The type species is Selenogyrus caeruleus.

Characteristic features
Selenogyrus has no rastellum (spines for digging) on the front of the chelicerae. This distinguishes it from Euphrictus. The stridulatory setae on the chelicerae are clavate (scimitar shaped).

Species
Selenogyrus africanus
Selenogyrus aureus
Selenogyrus austini
Selenogyrus brunneus
Selenogyrus caeruleus

References

Theraphosidae
Theraphosidae genera
Spiders of Africa